Serebrovsky is a Russian surname. Notable people with the surname include:

 Alexander Serebrovsky (1884–1938), Soviet engineer
 Alexander Sergeevich Serebrovsky (1892–1948), Soviet geneticist
 Pavel Serebrovsky (1888–1942), Soviet ornithologist

Russian-language surnames